Sinsoseol (Hangul: 신소설, Hanja: 新小說), literally "new novel" or "new fiction," was a type of Korean novel which began and grew during the Korean Empire, in the late 19th and early 20th century. It was sometimes referred to as gaehwagisoseol (Hangul: 개화기소설), or "enlightenment fiction."

Occurrence
The enlightenment (gaehwagi 개화기) changed Korean people's thought greatly. Some writers who wanted to enlighten people also appeared. Publishers imported modern printers so that they could sell many more books.

Contents
Usually, the contents of sinsoseol highlight enlightenment, or modernization. Encouragement of education, exploding old customs and superstitions, and criticism of corrupt officials are common themes of sinsoseol.

Major writers
 Yi In-jik (이인직): Hyeorui nu (혈의 누, Tears of blood), Gwiui seong (귀의 성, Ghost sound; 1906), Eunsegye (은세계, Silver world; 1908)
 Yi Hae-jo (이해조): Jayujong (자유종, Bell of liberty; 1910)
 Ahn Guk-sun (안국선): Geumsuhoeuirok (금수회의록, Proceedings of the animal meeting; 1908)

Fall in popularity
Sinsoseol was eventually replaced by modern novels.

References
  한국민족문화대사전 (Ethnic Korean Culture Dictionary)

Joseon dynasty works